

Cricket
 19 March - Makhaya Ntini becomes the first black person to represent South Africa in a five-day test cricket match

Football (Rugby Union)
 13 June - The South Africa (Springboks)  beat Ireland 37-13
 20 June - The Springboks  beat Ireland 33-0
 28 November - The Springboks  beat Ireland 27-13 at Lansdowne Road, Dublin, Ireland

Football (Soccer)
 16 December - South Africa (Bafana Bafana) beats Egypt 2-1 in the Nelson Mandela Challenge held at the FNB Stadium, Johannesburg

See also
1997 in South African sport
1998 in South Africa
1999 in South African sport 
Timeline of South African sport

 
South Africa